Dhond may refer to:

Dhond Abbasi, a tribe of northern Pakistan.
Daund, a city in Maharashtra state, India.
M. V. Dhond, Indian art critic